Sweetbread is a culinary name for the thymus (also called throat, gullet, or neck sweetbread) or pancreas (also called stomach, belly or gut sweetbread), typically from calf or lamb. Sweetbreads have a rich, slightly gamey flavor and a tender, succulent texture. They are often served as an appetizer or a main course and can be accompanied by a variety of sauces and side dishes.

The "heart" sweetbreads are more spherical, while the "throat" sweetbreads are more cylindrical. As the thymus is replaced by fibrous tissue in older animals, only pancreatic sweetbreads come from beef and pork. Like other edible non-muscle from animal carcasses, sweetbreads may be categorized as offal, "fancy meat", or "variety meat". Various other glands used as food may also sometimes be called "sweetbreads", including the parotid gland ("cheek" or "ear" sweetbread), the sublingual glands ("tongue" sweetbreads or "throat bread") as well as ovary and testicles.

Etymology 
The word sweetbread was first attested in the 16th century, but the etymology of the name is unclear. Sweet is perhaps used since the thymus is sweet and rich-tasting, as opposed to savory-tasting muscle flesh. Bread may come from Middle English , meaning "roast meat".

Varieties 

Sweetbreads are often soaked in salt water, then poached in milk, after which the outer membrane is removed. Once dried and chilled, they are often blanched, sautéed, grilled, or breaded and fried. They are also used for stuffing or in pâtés.

In Iran, Sweetbread is a common street food and is often served as a kebab.

In many Latin American cuisines, such as in the Argentine , they are grilled, floured and pan-fried 

In Greece, lamb thymus is usually used.

In Turkish cuisine, sweetbread is typically served in bread.

In French cuisine, there are many recipes for sweetbreads.

In Mexican cuisine, sweetbreads are often served with salsa verde.

See also 

 Head cheese, or brawn: typically, meat from the head of a calf or pig

References 

Offal